Shakti Singh Sisodia Mewar was the son of Maharana Udai Singh II Sisodia and Rani Sajja Bai Solanki. He was a Kshatriya Rajput and was younger brother of famous Maharana Pratap, He started the Shaktawat clan of Sisodia From his name Rajputs.

Shakti Singh was fierce warrior. It is a very famous belief that at some point during his lifetime, due to hostile relations with his father, he was expelled from Mewar and spent some time at Dungarpur royal palace. He saved Maharana Pratap's life during the Haldighati war, and after Maharana Pratap's horse Chetak died in the Haldighati canal, he gave Maharana Pratap his own horse.

Early Life
He was the 2nd son of Udai Singh II of Mewar born from his second wife Sajja Bai Solanki. He was born just months later after his elder brother Maharana Pratap. He had hostile relations with his father. Some sources say he was expelled from Mewar by his father.

Meeting with Akbar
When Mughal Emperor Akbar was marching towards Chittor to capture it, he invited Shakti Singh for meeting at Dhaulpur, he accepted the proposal and they met on 31 August 1567 but when Akbar explained his plan to capture Chittaurgarh and offered him throne of Mewar against his own family in a hope that people of Mewar will not resist akbar if Shakti Singh will be crowned. Shakti Singh left the meeting in anger without Akbar's permission and at midnight he ran away from Dhaulpur where Akbar was encamped to inform his father about Akbar's plan to capture Chittor to save Chittor fort, this angered Akbar resulting immediate change of Akbar's plan to attack Malwa and he marched his army towards Chittaurgarh .  Only because of Shakti Singh his father was able to make preparations for Mughal attack. However, Chittor was sacked in Siege of Chittorgarh (1567–1568)

Later Life
His father died at Gogunda on 28 February 1572 and his elder brother Maharana Pratap was crowned as the Rana of Mewar on 1 March 1572 by nobles of Mewar. Some sources say he was again expelled this time by his brother due to mistaken death of Raj Purohit Narayanandas by Shakti. He went into the service of Dungarpur Rawal Askaran between 1572-1576, there he killed any noble named Jagmal due to his hot temper. He then went to Mughal service however there are no records of him fighting in any war for Mughals. In 1576 the Battle of Haldighati, he returned to his brother Maharana Pratap's side giving his own horse after the famous Chetak collapsed near Banas River to Maharana Pratap to retreat in the hills. He also killed Khurasan Khan and Multan Khan who were chasing Pratap.

After Pratap
Later under the rule of Maharana Amar Singh I (son of maharana pratap) Shakti Singhji ruled from Bhainsrorgarh, later on Shakti Singh's 11 out of 17 sons were martyred fighting against Mughal invaders for their motherland Mewar. Rawat Achaldas of Kannauj(Mewar) and later Baansi, was the leader of Mewar Forces during his times. Battle of Untala is a famous incident of self sacrifice for Maharan's cause in these tough times for Mewar.

This couplet is very famous among Mewari people which praises Shakti -
शक्ता थारी शक्ति नु हरि जाने ना कोई, 
शुरा थारी हुँकार सु महाकाल निकट ना आए|  His descendants are known as the Shaktawats.

Portrayal in adaptions 
In Indian historical  serial Bharat Ka Veer Putra - Maharana Pratap, adult Shakti Singh is portrayed by Vineet Kumar.

References 

Mewar dynasty
Indian royalty
16th-century Indian people